Raymond Henri Fortin (born March 11, 1941) is a Canadian retired professional ice hockey player who played 92 games in the National Hockey League for the St. Louis Blues.

External links

1941 births
Living people
Canadian ice hockey defencemen
Ice hockey people from Quebec
Sportspeople from Drummondville
St. Louis Blues players